Stockbroker's Tudor, sometimes alternatively Stockbrokers Tudor or Stockbroker Tudor, was a term coined by the architectural historian and cartoonist Osbert Lancaster for a style of house that became popular in Britain in the first half of the 20th century, employing pastiche Tudor features on the façades of houses, before and during the development of suburban Metroland.

Style
In his 1938 book Pillar to Post: The Pocket Lamp of Architecture, Lancaster commented that although Tudor buildings were on the whole cramped and ill-lit, they were regarded by many in the early 20th century as picturesque: "so deep and so widespread was the … devotion to the olde-worlde that an enormous number of such houses were erected, at considerable expense". At first the expense restricted the style to the residences of well-off citizens such as stockbrokers, but later the invention of new and cheaper methods of construction brought the style within the reach of the builders of the large housing estates of Metroland – the commuter suburbs.

Lancaster remarked that it was unnerving to be confronted with "a hundred and fifty accurate reproductions of Anne Hathaway’s cottage, each complete with central-heating and garage" and added that the latest methods of mass-production were being used to turn out "a stream of old oak beams, leaded window-panes and small discs of bottle-glass, all structural devices which our ancestors lost no time in abandoning as soon as an increase in wealth and knowledge enabled them to do so".

The term "Stockbroker's Tudor" became common usage and was later employed by Robert Graves in a social history of Britain and in books about architecture in countries other than the UK, as well as in the press of various countries. Examples of the style are also seen – and identified by Lancaster's term – in Australia, Canada, Ireland and the US. A 2015 study of American architecture comments that the style is "equated with stability, venerability, and success in society and business, due in no small part to the notoriety of the 'stockbroker Tudor' neighborhoods in New York City’s toniest suburbs".

References and sources

References

Sources

Further reading 

 
 
 
 
 
 
 
 
 

Architectural styles
British architectural styles